Dan Laksov (10 July 1940 – 25 October 2013) was a Norwegian-Swedish mathematician and human rights activist.

Biography 
He graduated in mathematics from the University of Bergen and took the doctorate at the Massachusetts Institute of Technology. He was a professor of mathematics at the Royal Institute of Technology in Sweden. He also served as a director of the Mittag-Leffler Institute and editor of the institute's journal Acta Mathematica. His main contributions were in algebra, algebraic geometry and Schubert calculus. He was a fellow of the Norwegian Academy of Science and Letters. In 2008 he received an honorary degree at the University of Bergen.

Laksov was born in Oslo in 1940, the same year that Norway was occupied by Nazi Germany. He was a son of Amalie Laksov (née Scheer) and Håkon Laksov; the family were Jews. In the book I slik en natt. Historien om deportasjonen av jøder fra Norge by Kristian Ottosen, the escape of Amalie and Dan from Norway in November 1942 is chronicled. Håkon and Amalie's four brothers were all captured as a part of the arresting of all Norwegian Jews, shipped to Auschwitz and perished there. The family's apartment was usurped by the family of a leading Young Nazi leader, Bjørn Østring, but retrieved after the war. In 1945 Dan returned to Oslo where he lived with his grandparents, while Amalie commuted to Bergen. In 1983, Amalie Laksov created a foundation for human rights, Amalie Laksovs Minnefond. Dan Laksov was a board member here, and member of the committee that awarded the Laksov Prize for human rights. Amalie Laksov died in 2008, aged 97, while Dan Laksov died in Stockholm in October 2013.

References

1940 births
2013 deaths
Scientists from Oslo
Norwegian Jews
Norwegian people of World War II
University of Bergen alumni
Massachusetts Institute of Technology alumni
Norwegian expatriates in the United States
Academic staff of the KTH Royal Institute of Technology
Members of the Norwegian Academy of Science and Letters
20th-century Norwegian mathematicians
Norwegian human rights activists
Norwegian emigrants to Sweden
Swedish mathematicians
Swedish human rights activists
Norwegian refugees
Refugees in Sweden
Child refugees
Jewish refugees
Members of the Royal Swedish Academy of Sciences